Bomi Ardeshir Jamula (born 26 July 1953) is a former Indian cricket umpire. He stood in five ODI games between 1990 and 1999.

See also
 List of One Day International cricket umpires

References

1953 births
Living people
Indian One Day International cricket umpires
Cricketers from Mumbai